Disk Usage Analyzer is a graphical disk usage analyzer for GNOME. It was part of GNOME Core Applications, but was split off for GNOME 3.4. It was originally named Baobab after the Adansonia tree. The software gives the user a menu-driven, graphical representation of what is on a disk drive. The interface allows for selection of specific parts of filesystem being scanned so a single folder, the entire filesystem, and even remote folders and filesystems can be scanned. The graphical representation can be switched between a ring chart and a treemap chart so the presentation can be tailored to the specific content being scanned.

In 2012, Disk Usage Analyzer was rewritten in Vala.

Future 
At the GNOME Users And Developers European Conference (GUADEC) in 2013, a plan to merge the Disk Usage Analyzer with gnome-system-monitor to a new program called Usage was presented.

References

External links 

Free system software
Disk usage analysis software
GNOME Core Applications
Free software programmed in Vala
Software that uses Meson

ar:باوباب